Acanthoproctus is a genus of African bush crickets in the subfamily Hetrodinae and tribe Eugastrini.

Species

 Acanthoproctus cervinus — Antlered thorny katydid
 Acanthoproctus diadematus — Namibia katydid
 Acanthoproctus vittatus — Striped thorny katydid

References 

Tettigoniidae genera